Osy Ikhile is a British actor best known for his roles as Richard Peterson in In the Heart of the Sea and Milo Rodricks in Childhood's End. In 2017, he appeared in USS Callister, an episode of the anthology series Black Mirror.

Filmography

Filmmaking credits
 Normal? (2014) – directed, produced
 Clap! (2014) – directed, produced, wrote, edited, director of photography
 Hot Pepper Episode: "One-Night Stand" (2015) – director of photography, gaffer
 The Moor Girl (2017) – produced
 Beauty in the Street (2017) – co-produced
 The Reserves (2018) – executive produced

Film

Television

Video games

Stage

References

External links

Living people
Black British male actors
British people of Nigerian descent
English male film actors
Male actors from London
Year of birth missing (living people)